Steven Lewis Simpson is an independent film and documentary filmmaker from Aberdeen, Scotland. Films include Rez Bomb, Neither Wolf Nor Dog, The Ticking Man, Retribution, Ties, the feature documentary A Thunder-Being Nation that was made over 13-years about Pine Ridge Indian Reservation, and the 13-part TV series The Hub, which was the first original series commissioned by the first 24/7 Native American TV channel in the US FNX.

In 2018 he gave a TEDx Talk about distributing his own film, Neither Wolf Nor Dog, in around 200 theatres in the US. Simpson claims it has been the longest first-run theatrical release of any movie in the US in at least a decade.

History
At 18, Steven Lewis Simpson was the youngest fully qualified stockbroker and trader.

References

External links
 
 Rez Bomb official film site

Year of birth missing (living people)
Living people
Scottish screenwriters
Scottish film directors